Jan Grarup (born 1968) is a Danish photojournalist who has worked both as a staff photographer and as a freelance, specializing in war and conflict photography. He has won many prizes including the World Press Photo award for his coverage of the war in Kosovo.

Early life

Grarup was born in Kvistgaard, not far from Helsingør, in the north of the Danish island of Sjælland. He got his first camera when he was 13 and began to develop black and white photographs. At the age of 15 he took a photograph of a traffic accident and sent it in to the local newspaper Helsingør Dagblad where it was published. When he was 17, he spent his Easter holidays in Belfast at the time of the troubles, gaining an appetite for conflicts.

After studying journalism and photography at the Danish School of Journalism in Aarhus from 1989 to 1991, he became first a trainee, then a full-time photographer with the Danish tabloid Ekstra Bladet.

Career

In 1991, the year he graduated, Grarup won the Danish Press Photographer of the Year award, a prize he would receive on several further occasions. In 1993, he moved to Berlin for a year, working as a freelance photographer for Danish newspapers and magazines.

During his career, Grarup has covered many wars and conflicts around the world including the Gulf War, the Rwandan genocide, the Siege of Sarajevo and the Palestinian uprising against Israel in 2000. His coverage of the conflict between Palestine and Israel gave rise to two series: The Boys of Ramallah, which also earned him the Pictures of the Year International World Understanding Award in 2002, followed by The Boys from Hebron.

His book, Shadowland (2006), presents his work during the 12 years he spent in Kashmir, Sierra Leone, Chechnya, Rwanda, Kosovo, Slovakia, Ramallah, Hebron, Iraq, Iran, and Darfur. In the words of Foto8's review, it is "intensely personal, deeply felt, and immaculately composed." His second book, Darfur: A Silent Genocide, was published in 2009.

Per Folkver, Picture Editor in Chief of the Copenhagen daily Politiken, where Grarup has worked, has said of Grarup that "He is concerned about what he is seeing and doing longer stories and returning to the same places."

After leaving his post at Politiken in the autumn of 2009, he joined the small Danish photographic firm Das Büro in January 2010 where he concentrated on the national market. He continues his international work with NOOR photo agency in Amsterdam, of which he is a cofounder.

Recent photographs include those of the earthquake in Haiti taken for Time and Dagbladet Information. In late 2011, Garup covered the refugee camp in Dadaab, Kenya.

Awards
1991: Picture of the year, Denmark. 1st. prize – Photographer of the year
1995: Picture of the year, Denmark. 1st. prize – Photographer of the year
2000: Picture of the year, Denmark. 1st. prize – Photographer of the year
2001: World Press Photo – 1st. prize, People in the news – stories
2001: UNICEF – Children photo of the Year. Jury's Special Award.
2001: Visa pour l'Image – VISA D`Or – Finalist.
2002: World Press Photo – 1st. prize, People in the news – stories
2002: Pictures of the Year International World Understanding Award
2002: Finalist, W. Eugene Smith Memorial Fund for Humanistic Photography, New York.
2002: UNICEF Children photo of the year award. 1st. Prize
2003: Picture of the year, Denmark.
2003: Feature Story of the Year, Denmark.
2004: Picture of the year, Denmark. 1st. prize – Photographer of the year
2005: Visa d'or.
2008: Picture of the year, Denmark. 1st. prize – Photographer of the year
2011: Leica Oskar Barnack Award winner.
2013: I Shot It, 1st prize, Black and White 2nd Quarter 2012.
2013: World Press Photo, 1st prize stories, Sports Feature.
2022: Sony World Photography Awards 2022, 1st prize Documentary Projects.

Bibliography

References

See also
Photography in Denmark

1968 births
20th-century Danish photographers
21st-century Danish photographers
Danish photojournalists
Politiken photojournalists
Living people
War photographers
People from Helsingør Municipality